Verkligheten (English: The Reality) is the eleventh studio album by Swedish melodic death metal band Soilwork, released on 11 January 2019 via Nuclear Blast. It is the first album to feature drummer Bastian Thusgaard as the replacement of longtime member Dirk Verbeuren. The album's release also marks the longest gap between Soilwork studio albums to date, with their previous album, The Ride Majestic, having been released nearly three and a half years earlier.

Loudwire named it one of the 50 best metal albums of 2019.

Background and recording
In a February 2017 interview with KaaosTV, frontman Björn "Speed" Strid revealed that the band would "slowly get into writing mode" for the follow-up to The Ride Majestic during the summer and enter the studio later that year. On 20 April 2017, the band officially announced Bastian Thusgaard as the permanent replacement to Dirk Verbeuren, who had departed from the band to join Megadeth in July 2016. The band also added that Thusgaard would be involved in the writing process of the new album.

On 4 April 2018, the band officially entered Nordic Sound Lab Studios in Skara, Sweden and the Panic Room in Skövde, Sweden with producer Thomas "PLEC" Johansson to begin recording their new album. The recording of the album was finished as of September 2018, scheduled for a tentative early 2019 release.

Strid commented on the new album:

Release
On 4 October 2018, the band posted an official teaser video for "Arrival", the first single of the new album. On 12 October 2018, the band revealed the title, tracklist and artwork of their new album Verkligheten, which would be released on 11 January 2019 via Nuclear Blast. A visualizer clip of "Arrival" was also available for streaming on the same day. On 26 October 2018, the band released the music video for the song "Full Moon Shoals". An animated music video directed by Elia Cristofoli for the song "Stålfågel" was released on 21 December 2018. The music video for the song "Witan" was available for streaming on 11 January 2019.

Track listing

Personnel

Soilwork
 Björn "Speed" Strid – vocals
 Sylvain Coudret – guitars
 David Andersson – guitars, bass, piano
 Sven Karlsson – keyboards
 Bastian Thusgaard – drums

Additional musicians
 Alissa White-Gluz – vocals 
 Tomi Joutsen – vocals 
 Dave Sheldon – vocals 
 Taylor Nordberg – backing vocals 
 Åsa-Hanna Carlsson – cello 

Production and design
 Thomas "PLEC" Johansson – production, recording, mixing, mastering
 Björn "Speed" Strid – production , recording 
 Jan Rechberger – recording 
 Viktor Brunö – mixing , mastering 
 Valnoir – cover art, layout, artwork , logo
 Tobias Green – design
 Therés Stephansdotter Björk – photography

Charts

References

2019 albums
Nuclear Blast albums
Soilwork albums